Friedrich Torberg (16 September 1908, Vienna, Alsergrund – 10 November 1979, Vienna) is the pen-name of Friedrich Kantor, an Austrian writer.

Biography 
He worked as a critic and journalist in Vienna and Prague until 1938, when his Jewish heritage compelled him to emigrate to France and, later, after being invited by the New York PEN-Club as one of "Ten outstanding German Anti-Nazi-Writers" (along with Heinrich Mann, Franz Werfel, Alfred Döblin, Leonhard Frank, Alfred Polgar, and others) to the United States, where he worked as a scriptwriter in Hollywood and then for Time magazine in New York City. In 1951 he returned to Vienna, where he remained for the rest of his life.

Torberg is known best for his satirical writings in fiction and nonfiction, as well as his translations into German of the stories of Ephraim Kishon, which remain the standard German language version of Kishon's work. A staunch anti-communist, Tobert used his prominence as a theater critic to boycott Bertolt Brecht's plays in most of Austria for over a decade. 

Austrian Olympic swimmer and swimsuit model Hedy Bienenfeld was the inspiration for the character "Lisa" in his novel The Pupil Gerber (Der Schüler Gerber).

Honours and awards
 Julius-Empire Award (1933)
 Title of Professor (1958)
 City of Vienna Prize for Journalism (1966) 
 Grand Cross of the Order of Merit of the Federal Republic of Germany (1968) 
 Austrian Cross of Honour for Science and Art, 1st class (1968) 
 Gold Medal of the Austrian capital Vienna (1974) 
 Richard Champion Medal (1974) 
 Austrian Decoration for Science and Art (1976)
 Grand Austrian State Prize for Literature (1979) 
 Naming of Torberggasse in Penzing (Vienna 14th District) (1981)

Selected works 
 Der Schüler Gerber hat absolviert (1930) (this semi-autobiographical novel tells the story of a grammar school student under the oppression of a tyrannical teacher); later editions bore the shortened title Der Schüler Gerber, under which the novel is now generally known.
 … und glauben, es wäre die Liebe (1932)
 Süsskind von Trimberg. Roman. Fischer, Frankfurt am Main 1972,  (fictitious biography) 
 Die Tante Jolesch oder Der Untergang des Abendlandes in Anekdoten (1975) (a collection of amusing yet bittersweet anecdotes about Jewish life and personalities in pre-Nazi Vienna and Prague, and in the emigration), translated by Maria Poglitsch Bauer and Sonat Hart, Ariadne Press, 2008, .
 Die Erben der Tante Jolesch (1978) (the sequel to the above)

Further reading 
  (The "Hazards of Versatility")

References

External links 
 http://www.forward.com/articles/13829/ (Coffee talk: Reading Friedrich Torberg's Masterpiece)
 Recordings with Friedrich Torberg in the Online Archive of the Österreichische Mediathek (in German). Retrieved 29 July 2019

1908 births
1979 deaths
People from Alsergrund
20th-century Austrian writers
Austrian translators
Translators to German
Austrian expatriates in Czechoslovakia
Austrian emigrants to France
French emigrants to the United States
Jewish Austrian writers
Burials at the Vienna Central Cemetery
Commanders Crosses of the Order of Merit of the Federal Republic of Germany
Recipients of the Austrian Decoration for Science and Art
Recipients of the Grand Austrian State Prize
20th-century translators
People from Prague
Austrian magazine founders